Andrés Martínez Sánchez (born 2 November 1954 in Inestrillas) is a paralympic athlete from Madrid, Spain competing mainly in category F10 shot put and discus events.

Biography
Andres Martinez competed in two paralympics, firstly his home games in Barcelona in 1992 Summer Paralympics then in Atlanta in 1996 Summer Paralympics.  In the 1992 games he finished fifth in both the pentathlon and discus before finishing second in the shot put behind compatriot Alfonso Fidalgo.  The 1996 games gave him his third paralympic games fifth place, in the discus and a bronze medal in the shot put.

Notes

References

External links
 

Paralympic athletes of Spain
Athletes (track and field) at the 1992 Summer Paralympics
Athletes (track and field) at the 1996 Summer Paralympics
Paralympic silver medalists for Spain
Paralympic bronze medalists for Spain
Living people
Medalists at the 1996 Summer Paralympics
Medalists at the 1992 Summer Paralympics
Paralympic medalists in athletics (track and field)
1954 births
Spanish male discus throwers
Spanish male shot putters
Visually impaired discus throwers
Visually impaired shot putters
Paralympic discus throwers
Paralympic shot putters